Hapoel Jerusalem Football Club (Mo'adon Kaduregel Hapoel Yerushalayim) is a professional football club based in Jerusalem, Israel. It plays in the Israeli Premier League, the top flight of Israeli football. Founded in 1926, their home ground is the Teddy Stadium.

As a protest against the conduct of the club's owners since the 1990s, the Hapoel Katamon Jerusalem football club was established in 2007, the first football club in Israel owned by its fans. The club was named after Katamon Stadium, which was formerly used by Hapoel Jerusalem. The club existed in parallel with Hapoel Jerusalem for 12 years.

In 2019, Hapoel Jerusalem was disbanded and in August 2020, Hapoel Katamon acquired the rights to the name Hapoel Jerusalem and officially became Hapoel Jerusalem. Since then, the club is owned by its fans and is managed by a board of seven members.

The team's record achievement is winning the State Cup and third place in the First League in 1973.

History

Hapoel Jerusalem Club was established in 1926 and played in the inaugural season of the EIFA league, playing the league's first match against local rivals Maccabi Hasmonean Jerusalem. The club played in the league for its first three seasons, however, the club was restricted to playing mainly in the Jerusalem area due to travelling difficulties. The club participated occasionally in the Palestine Cup, reaching the cup final in 1943, losing to a team from the Royal Artillery 1–7.

After the establishment of Israel, the club registered to play in the makeshift second-tier league, Liga Meuhedet, in the Jerusalem-Central division, which the club won. The club continued to play in the second division (Liga Bet until 1956 and Liga Alef afterwards), until it was promoted to the top division at the end of the 1956–57 season, after finishing second in promotion play-offs. Following the promotion, the club stayed in the top division for 21 seasons, achieving its best position, 3rd, in 1972–73. In 1971–72 the club reached the State Cup final, losing to Hapoel Tel Aviv 0–1. A season later, the club reached the cup final again, this time winning the cup.

The club was relegated to the second division in 1979, but bounced back the following season. The club continued to yo-yo between the two top divisions in the following seasons, playing his last season at the top division in 1999–2000. In 1998, the club reached its fourth cup final, but lost to Maccabi Haifa in extra time.

In the early 1990s, the club was transferred to businessmen Yossi Sassi and Victor Yona. The two ran the team together until falling out, leading to a long business and legal dispute which lasted until 2009, when Yona left the club. During the dispute, a group of supporters, tired of the feuding between the two businessmen, decided to establish a group, first in an attempt to purchase control of the club, and then in a bid to establish a fan-owned club, Hapoel Katamon Jerusalem. The fan-based club was established in 2009 (after a short period of existence as a merged club with Hapoel Mevaseret Zion) and progressed to the Liga Leumit in 2013–14, where the two clubs met for the first time.

The club played in the third tier Liga Aleph after being relegated from the second tier Liga Leumit in the 2016–17. On 26 August 2019 the Israeli Football Federation refused to list the club for 2019–20 season due to financial problems.

On August 9, 2020, the club has been officially recreated, as Hapoel Katamon renamed to Hapoel Jerusalem.

On April 30, 2021, Hapoel Jerusalem won against Sektzia Nes Ziona, thereby securing promotion to the top flight, after an absence of 21 years from the top flight.

Stadiums
Since the establishment of Israel, the club played in three stadiums, YMCA stadium, in which the club played between 1949 and 1955, when the club moved to its own Katamon Stadium, in the neighborhood of Katamon. Katamon Stadium was razed in 1982, with the intention to build a bigger modern stadium in its place, and in the meantime the club returned to play in YMCA stadium. The new stadium in Katamon was never built, and instead Teddy Stadium was built in the Malha neighborhood, to which the club moved in 1992.

Support
During the early years, support of the club came mostly from the labour organizations in Israel. City rivals Beitar were identified with the right-wing nationalist organizations. All this played out to create the Jerusalem derby. To this day the rivalry exists, though it is not nearly as heated as when both clubs played in the top division of Israeli football. In 2007 a large majority of fans, unhappy with the management of the club, defected and founded Hapoel Katamon Jerusalem F.C., the first fully fan-owned club in the country.

Current squad

Former players
 Hapoel Jerusalem (1926–2019)
  Viktor Paço
  Matías Martín
  Shay Aharon
  Zahi Armeli
  Ofir Azu
  Jacob Buzaglo
  Eli Ben Rimoz
  Rafi Cohen (born 1965)
  Dudu Dahan
  Michele Dayan
  Ehud Kachila
  Zion Marili
  Moti Ohayon
  Dan Roman
  Liran Strauber
  Nahum Ta-Shma
  Idan Tal
  Assi Tubi

 Hapoel Katamon (2007–2020)
  Shay Aharon
  Aviram Baruchyan
  Idan Shemesh

Coaching staff

Honours

League

Cups

Other titles

External links

References

 
Jerusalem
Football
Association football clubs established in 1926
1926 establishments in Mandatory Palestine